Mikaela Metalla (born 22 October 2002) is an Albanian footballer who plays as a midfielder for Tirana AS and the Albania women's national team.

Career
Metalla is a member of the Albania national team and made her debut as a substitute against Cyprus on 27 November 2020. Prior to playing for Tirana AS, she was playing for KFF Teuta.

See also
List of Albania women's international footballers

References

2002 births
Living people
Footballers from Durrës
Albanian footballers
Albanian women's footballers
Women's association football midfielders
KFF Tirana AS players
Albania women's international footballers